Printspying, a deviation from warspying, is when you connect to an insecure wireless printing network (instead of an insecure wireless internet connection or video feed), and proceed to print pornography and/or pictures from shock websites to the printer. Printspying is best when done when connected to a personal print network (home) but can also be done on business networks.

Espionage